Climate change in Washington, D.C. is marked by rising temperatures, increased rainfall and flooding, and storm surges of the Potomac River. Tourism is directly impacted as the cherry blossom bloom is shifting. The city's government is active in climate adaptation and mitigation efforts.

Consequences

Rising temperatures 
Climate change has already caused a 2 °F temperature rise (compared to 50 years ago) in D.C., warming more than the average nationwide.  By the 2080s, the average summer high temperature of the district is expected to increase from the historic high of 87 °F to anywhere between 93 °F and 97 °F. This continues the trend of the District's rising summer temperatures, as five out of six of the District's hottest recorded summers have transpired after 2010. These rising temperatures have an adverse effect on the health of residents, raising the risk of heat-related illnesses, respiratory issues due to increased ozone, pollen, and ragweed counts, and increased disease spread by mosquitoes due to the higher biting rates and faster life cycles caused by rising temperatures.

Summers are 5–10% more humid in 2019 than they were in the 1970s, according to analysis by the Washington Post. This results in up to a 5 degree increase in perceived temperature. Thus an 86 degree summer day, which felt like 89 degrees in the 1970s, may now feel more like 91–92 degrees.

Shifting rainfall 
Rainfall is expected to increase during the winter and spring, but remain largely stagnant during fall and summer. This, when combined with increased temperatures drying soil, will increase flooding during winter and spring but increase drought during fall and summer.

Flooding and land subsidence 
By 2017, land subsidence was ongoing, nuisance flooding had become more common in the waterfront areas of the city.

Early blooming of cherry blossoms 
Washington’s cherry trees are blooming earlier: since 1921, peak bloom dates have shifted earlier by approximately five days. The timing of the peak bloom is important to tourism and the local economy because the cherry blossoms draw more than one million people each year, many of whom are visitors.

Climate change mitigation policies 
The City of the District of Columbia is implementing a ClimateReady DC plan.

The city has mandated 50% renewable energy by 2032.

Solar Works DC, a program which trains local workers to install residential solar panels, is installing solar on hundreds of homes of low-income residents.

See also 
 Plug-in electric vehicles in Washington, D.C.

References 

Washington, D.C.
Environment of Washington, D.C.
Climate of Washington, D.C.